Elim, according to the Hebrew Bible, was one of the places where the Israelites camped following their Exodus from Egypt. It is referred to in Exodus 15:27 and Numbers 33:9 as a place where "there were twelve wells of water and seventy date palms," and that the Israelites "camped there near the waters".

From the information that can be gleaned from Exodus 15:23, 16:1, and Numbers 33:9-11, Elim is described as being between Marah and the Wilderness of Sin, near the eastern shore of the Red Sea. It was possibly south of the Israelites' crossing point, and to the west of the Sin Wilderness. Thus, Elim is generally thought to have been located in Wadi Gharandel, an oasis 100 km southeast of Suez. 

Professor Menashe Har-El of Tel Aviv University (1968) has proposed Elim to be `Ayun Musa "the springs/wells of Moses." He noted that in 1907 the geologist Thomas Barron had observed that 12 springs existed at this site along with palm trees. Professor James K. Hoffmeier disagrees on the basis that it is too close to the preceding site (seven miles/twelve kilometres) and would require the next four sites (using the Numbers itinerary) to be compressed into only 38 kilometres.

The Book of Exodus records that the Israelites left Elim "on the fifteenth day of the second month after leaving Egypt" (Exodus 16:1), heading towards Mount Sinai through the Wilderness of Sin.  In that the Israelites left Rameses at midnight on the 14th/15th of the first month (Exodus 12:18,29) it was a (lunar) month after this when they departed Elim for Mount Sinai. 

There is a possibility that the name 'Elim' is derived from a Semitic root meaning 'gods', but this cannot be further substantiated (see El (god)).

See also
 Oyun Musa

References

 

Torah_places